Man in Hiding or The Man in Hiding is the title of two films:

 Man in Hiding, American title of Mantrap (1953 film), a British crime film
 The Man in Hiding (Spanish title: El hombre oculto), a 1971 Spanish drama